Candace Chong Mui Ngam is a Chinese playwright from Hong Kong who has written scripts for play such as The French Kiss (2005), Murder in San José (2009) and The Wild Boar (2012). She has won the Hong Kong Drama Award four times in the category of Best Script and in 2010 was given the title best drama artist by the Hong Kong Arts Development Council.

Life and career
Chong was born in Hong Kong in 1976 and attended St. Paul's Co-educational College before deciding to study psychology at the Chinese University of Hong Kong. After graduating in 1999 she majored in play-writing at the Hong Kong Academy for Performing Arts and then traveled to London to complete her master's degree at Royal Holloway, University of London.

After completing her formal education, Chong joined the Chung Ying Theatre Company where she wrote her award-winning plays Alive in the Mortuary (2003), Shall We Go to Mars? (2005), French Kiss (2005), Murder in San José (2009) and The Wild Boar (2012). In 2011 she worked with American composer Huang Ruo to write a libretto for an opera about Dr. Sun Yat-sen. The completed work premiered at the National Centre for the Performing Arts in Beijing and later was adapted worldwide after it was well received.

References

External links
 

1976 births
Living people
Alumni of Royal Holloway, University of London
Alumni of St. Paul's Co-educational College
Alumni of the Chinese University of Hong Kong
Alumni of The Hong Kong Academy for Performing Arts
Women dramatists and playwrights
Women screenwriters
Hong Kong dramatists and playwrights
Hong Kong screenwriters